These are the number-one singles of 1966 according to the Top 100 Singles chart in Cashbox magazine

See also
 1966 in music
 List of Hot 100 number-one singles of 1966 (U.S.)

References
 https://web.archive.org/web/20101121003637/http://cashboxmagazine.com/archives/60s_files/1966.html
 http://musicseek.info/no1hits/1966.htm

1966
1966 record charts
1966 in American music